The 1964 Giro di Lombardia was the 58th edition of the Giro di Lombardia cycle race and was held on 17 October 1964. The race started in Milan and finished in Como. The race was won by Gianni Motta of the Molteni team.

General classification

References

1964
Giro di Lombardia
Giro di Lombardia
1964 Super Prestige Pernod